Woolong may refer to:
 Wulong District, a district of Chongqing Municipality, China
 Woolong, a fictional currency used in science fiction anime television series Cowboy Bebop, Space Dandy and Carole & Tuesday

See also
 Wolong (disambiguation)
 Wollongong, New South Wales, Australia